The Nashville Nightshade are a professional women's ultimate frisbee team based in Nashville, Tennessee. They play in the Premier Ultimate league and were one of the eight founding teams of the league. With the cancellation of the PUL's 2020 season due to the COVID-19 pandemic, the Nightshade have only played one season. The Nightshade are a community-owned non-profit organization.

Franchise history 
Founded in 2018, the Nightshade began play in 2019, the PUL's first season of play. The Nightshade's second season was scheduled to begin in 2020, however, the COVID-19 pandemic put a pause on most major sports leagues, the PUL included.

References 

Premier Ultimate League teams
Ultimate (sport) teams
Ultimate teams established in 2018
Women's sports in Tennessee